is a passenger railway station located in the city of Hachiōji, Tokyo, Japan, operated by East Japan Railway Company (JR East).

Lines
The station is 5.1 kilometers from the official starting point of the line at Hachiōji Station.

Station layout

The station consists of two ground-level opposed side platforms serving two tracks, connected by a footbridge. The station is attended.

Platforms

History
The station opened on 10 December 1931. With the privatization of Japanese National Railways (JNR) on 1 April 1987, the station came under the control of JR East.

The southern section of the Hachiko Line between Hachiōji and Komagawa was electrified on 16 March 1996, with through services commencing between Hachiōji and Kawagoe.

Passenger statistics
In fiscal 2019, the station was used by an average of 3,055 passengers daily (boarding passengers only).

The passenger figures (boarding passengers only) for previous years are as shown below.

Surrounding area
Hachioji City Komiya Elementary School
Hachioji City Ishikawa Junior High School
Hachioji City Hall Ishikawa Office

See also
 List of railway stations in Japan

References

External links

  

Railway stations in Japan opened in 1931
Railway stations in Tokyo
Stations of East Japan Railway Company
Hachikō Line
Hachiōji, Tokyo